Perry is an alcoholic beverage made of fermented pear juice.

Perry may also refer to:

People 
 Perry (given name)
 Perry (surname)

Places

United States 
 Perry, Arkansas 
 Perry, Florida
 Perry, Georgia
 Perry, Illinois
 Perry, Iowa
 Perry, Kansas
 Perry, Louisiana
 Perry, Maine
 Perry, Michigan
 Perry, Missouri
 Perry, Nebraska
 Perry, New York (disambiguation)
 Perry, Ohio
 Perry, Oklahoma
 Perry, Oregon
 Perry, South Carolina
 Perry, Texas
 Perry, Utah
 Perry, West Virginia
 Perry, Wisconsin
 Perry County (disambiguation)
 Perry Township (disambiguation)

Other
 Perry, Cambridgeshire, England
 River Perry, Shropshire, England
 Perry, Ontario, Canada
 Shire of Perry, a former local government area in Queensland, Australia

Ships 
 , various ships

Organisations 
 Perry (car), by the defunct British car maker Perry Motor Company
 Perry Drug Stores, a defunct chain in the United States
 Perry & Co., an English pen-maker company

Other uses 
 Perry (album), by the American singer Perry Como
 Perry Nuclear Generating Station, in Lake County, Ohio
 Perry the Platypus, a fictional character from the animated television series "Phineas and Ferb"
 Perry, the official mascot of the 2022 Commonwealth Games
 The Band Perry, an American music group

See also 
 Perry River (disambiguation)
 Parry (disambiguation)
 Peri (disambiguation)
 Perri (disambiguation)
 Perry's (disambiguation) (also includes Perrys)
 Justice Perry (disambiguation)